Łazarz may refer to:
Łazarz, part of the district of Grunwald in Poznań, western Poland
Łazarz, Podlaskie Voivodeship, a settlement in north-eastern Poland